The Afro-Academic, Cultural, Technological and Scientific Olympics (ACT-SO), informally named the "Olympics of the Mind," is a youth program of the NAACP that is "designed to recruit, stimulate, improve and encourage high academic and cultural achievement among African American high school students." The year-long program recognizes and awards young people who have demonstrated academic and cultural achievement. Gold, silver, and bronze medals, along with cash awards, are awarded to winners in each of 29 categories of competition in the sciences, humanities, business, performing and visual arts, and local and national entrepreneurship/ culinary competitions. Active in nearly 400 cities, ACT-SO is the largest academic promotion for black youths in America.

History
ACT-SO was founded in 1978 by author and journalist Vernon Jarrett (1918-2004). The program was intended to give recognition to young people who could demonstrate academic, scientific, and artistic achievement, allowing young people to gain recognition equal to that often achieved by entertainers and athletes. The first national ACT-SO competition was held in 1978 in Portland, Oregon.

Since its inception, almost 300,000 young people have participated in the program, and more than 700 gold medals have been awarded to youths around the United States. Over $350,000 has been granted in monetary awards, scholarships, and laptop computers.

Historical timeline 

1976: Vernon Jarrett presented his concept for ACT-SO, an "Olympics of the Mind", to the DuSable Museum of African American History in Chicago. It was later decided that the program would better serve youth nationally rather than just in the Chicago area.

1977: Jarrett approached NAACP Executive Director Dr. Benjamin Hooks, who was responsive to the idea of ACT-SO and approached the NAACP National Board of Directors. The board adopted a resolution to accept ACT-SO as an officially sponsored NAACP youth achievement program. Local NAACP branches would be called upon to sponsor ACT-SO, conduct local competitions annually, and then take local gold medalists to an annual national ACT-SO competition.

1978: The first National ACT-SO competition was held in Portland, Oregon with seven cities participating: Atlanta, Baltimore, Chicago, Kansas City, Los Angeles, New Orleans, and St. Louis.

1980: Barbara Coggins, one of Vernon Jarrett's colleagues, was hired as the first National ACT-SO Director and designed a structural framework for establishing and running ACT-SO programs across the country.

1991: The NAACP Board of Directors created its own ACT-SO committee.

2004: Jarrett died of cancer at the age of 82.

Today, ACT-SO sustains approximately 200 programs nationally. Over the past 30 years, over 200,000 black high school students have participated in the program at local and national levels.

Mission
For over thirty years the mission of ACT-SO has been to prepare, recognize and reward youth of African descent who exemplify scholastic and artistic excellence.

Original goals (1977):
To encourage and recognize academic achievement of African American students.
To promote excellence and highlight academic achievement as well as support the accomplishments of these students.
To encourage communities to become involved in working as partners in the quest for scholastic achievement by serving as mentors, fundraisers, sponsors, and organizers.

According to the NAACP, the program’s goals are:
To mobilize the adult community for the promotion of classroom and after-school excellence
To recognize academic achievement among youth on par with the recognition awarded athletics
To provide and assist students with the necessary skills and tools to establish goals and acquire the confidence and training to make a successful contribution to society

Participation Eligibility
Annual academic competitions are conducted for students of African descent who are U.S. citizens enrolled in grades 9–12 and are amateurs in the competition categories. Winners of the competition at each local branch are eligible for awards at the finals during the NAACP national convention, which occurs every July. The 2015 national competition was in Philadelphia, Pennsylvania.

Competition Categories

Students can select up to 3 categories to compete in from a total of 29 offerings:

STEM (Science, Technology, Engineering, & Math):
Architecture
Biology/Microbiology
Chemistry/Biochemistry
Computer Science
Earth and Space Sciences
Engineering
Mathematics
Medicine and Health
Physics
HUMANITIES:
Music Composition
Original Essay
Playwriting
Poetry (Written)
Short Story
THE PERFORMING ARTS:
Dance
Dramatics
Music Instrumental (Classical)
Music Instrumental (Contemporary) 
Music Vocal (Classical)
Music Vocal (Contemporary)
Oratory
Poetry (Performance)
THE VISUAL ARTS:
Drawing
Filmmaking
Painting
Photography
Sculpture
BUSINESS:
Entrepreneurship
CULINARY:
Culinary Arts

Awards
Gold, silver, and bronze medals, along with cash awards, are awarded to winners in each of 29 categories of competition. Competition winners receive medals and prizes provided by local and regional sponsors and contributors. Local Gold Medalists advance to the National Competition and compete against more than 800-900 gold medalists representing approximately 200 NAACP Branches nationwide and have the opportunity to receive scholarships and other rewards provided by national sponsors.

Gold medalists: $2,000
Silver medalists: $1,500
Bronze medalists: $1,000

Sponsors
ACT-SO is sponsored by the National Association for the Advancement of Colored People (NAACP), which is the nation's oldest and largest civil rights organization. ACT-SO receives support from schools, community organizations, churches, foundations, local businesses, major corporations and individuals.

The ACT-SO program has many corporate sponsorships from major American corporations, including McDonald's, UPS, Walmart, State Farm, The Walt Disney Company, Comcast, Hyundai, and others.

Notable ACT-SO alumni

Anthony Anderson
Michael Beach
Adam Davenport
Tananarive Due
Edwina Findley-Dickerson
Nicole Heaston
Lauryn Hill
Jennifer Hudson
Mae Jemison
Alicia Keys
Jada Pinkett-Smith
Justin Simien
John Singleton
Cornelius Smith Jr.
Kanye West
Michelle Williams
Amber Stroud

References

External links
NAACP ACT-SO
New York City ACT-SO
DuPage County ACT-SO
New Jersey ACT-SO
Walt Disney World Public Affairs: 800 Students Compete in NAACP ACT-SO National Competition Hosted by Disney (2008 Awards)
ACT-SO videos on Youtube

Education awards
NAACP
Awards honoring African Americans